William Tarver (2 November 1872 – 8 April 1952) was an English cricketer. He played in three first-class matches for the Jamaican cricket team in 1901/02.

See also
 List of Jamaican representative cricketers

References

External links
 

1872 births
1952 deaths
English cricketers
Jamaica cricketers
People from Newport Pagnell